Rhabdophis helleri, Heller’s red-necked keelback, is a keelback snake in the family Colubridae found in South Asia

Distribution

China (Yunnan, Guangxi, Guangdong, Fujian, Hong Kong, Sichuan, Guizhou), N Vietnam, Myanmar, India (Assam ?, Mizoram, Sikkim; Arunachal Pradesh, Tripura), Bhutan, Bangladesh, Nepal

Type locality: Tengyueh, 5500 feet elevation, Province of
Yunnan, China, 25°01'N, 98°30'E.

References

Rhabdophis
Snakes of Southeast Asia
Reptiles of Vietnam
Reptiles of China
Reptiles described in 1925
Taxa named by Karl Patterson Schmidt